Nupserha spinifera is a species of beetle in the family Cerambycidae. It was described by Gressitt in 1948.

Subspecies
 Nupserha spinifera spinifera Gressitt, 1948
 Nupserha spinifera sumatrana Breuning, 1960

References

spinifera
Beetles described in 1948